Isabelle Koppe-van Dishoek (born 1953) is a Dutch former cricketer who played as a wicket-keeper. She appeared for Netherlands in six One Day Internationals, all at the 1988 Women's Cricket World Cup in Australia. She took three catches and scored eight runs in five innings as her side finished bottom of the table, failing to win any matches.

References

External links
 
 

1953 births
Living people
Dutch women cricketers
Netherlands women One Day International cricketers
Wicket-keepers